São José (Portuguese for Saint Joseph) is a village in the western part of São Tomé Island in São Tomé and Príncipe. Its population is 98 (2012 census). It lies 2.5 km south of Diogo Vaz, 4 km northeast of Santa Catarina and 9 km southwest of Neves.

Population history

References

Populated places in Lembá District